Ironclads: American Civil War is a 3D naval historical turned-based strategy game based on the American Civil War.

The player operates a squadron of warships of the United States Navy or the Confederate States Navy: broadside ironclads, ironclad rams, ironclad turret ships, monitors, sloops-of-war, gunboats and screw commerce raiders. The player is tasked with destroying the opponent's ships, coastal batteries and warehouses.

A lot of attention went into the details, historical accuracy and convenience of the interface. 3D models of the ships are based on archival drawings. Realistic ship to ship combat simulating the characteristics of each ship, including: damage, flooding, fires, destruction, armor values and guns.

References

External links 
 Official website

2008 video games
Windows games
Windows-only games
American Civil War video games
Naval video games
Turn-based tactics video games
Video games developed in Russia
Strategy First games